Harvinder "Harry" Anand is the former Mayor of Laurel Hollow, New York; he was elected on June 19, 2007. He is the first elected Indian-American mayor in the state of New York. He was sworn into office on July 2, 2007. In June 2011, he was reelected to his third term as mayor. He did not run for a fourth term in 2013.

Anand is a chemical engineer who graduated from Punjab University in Chandigarh, India and later immigrated to the United States in 1982. He is the President of the now sold Royce International, an American company involved in the distribution of industrial chemicals.

Anand also serves as the Commissioner of Police for Laurel Hollow. He attended the Civilian Police Academy in Nassau County, New York. He also serves as the Director of the Nassau County Law Enforcement Exploring Advisory Board. He is an active member of the Nassau County Police Reserves.  

After his election, many articles have been written about him in Indian and American media including The New York Times. He was also interviewed on the Meet the Leaders program on Cablevision.

References

Living people
Indian emigrants to the United States
American mayors of Indian descent
American politicians of Indian descent
American Sikhs
American people of Punjabi descent
Mayors of places in New York (state)
Asian-American people in New York (state) politics
Year of birth missing (living people)
People from Laurel Hollow, New York